Brownea is a genus of about 30 species in the family Fabaceae, subfamily Detarioideae. The genus is native to tropical regions of the Americas. The species are shrubs and trees growing to 20 m tall.

Species
Brownea angustiflora Little 
Brownea ariza Benth. 
Brownea birschellii Hook. f.
Brownea bolivarensis Pittier 
Brownea cauliflora Poepp. & Endl. 
Brownea coccinea Jacq.
Brownea crawfordii W. Watson 
Brownea disepala Little 
Brownea enricii Quinones 
Brownea excelsa (Pittier) J.F. Macbr. 
Brownea gladisrojasiae D. Velasquez & Agostini 
Brownea grandiceps Jacq. 
Brownea herthae Harms 
Brownea holtonii Britton & Killip 
Brownea hybrida Backer 
Brownea leucantha Jacq. 
Brownea longipedicellata Huber 
Brownea loretensis Standl. 
Brownea macbrideana J.F. Macbr. 
Brownea macrophylla Linden ex Mast. 
Brownea multijuga Britton & Killip 
Brownea negrensis Benth.
Brownea peruviana J.F. Macbr. 
Brownea puberula Little 
Brownea rosa-de-monte Bergius 
Brownea santanderensis Quinones
Brownea similis Cowan 
Brownea stenantha Britton & Killip 
Brownea tillettiana D. Velasquez & Agostini 
Brownea ucayalina (Huber) Ducke

References

 
Taxonomy articles created by Polbot
Fabaceae genera